is a Japanese manga series written and illustrated by Tatsuya Hiruta. It was serialized in Kodansha's shōnen manga magazine Weekly Shōnen Magazine from 1982 to 1994, with its chapters collected in 59 tankōbon volumes. It was followed by two sequel series: Shin Kōtarō Makaritōru!, serialized from 1995 to 2001, with its chapters collected in 27 volumes, and Kōtarō Makaritōru! L, serialized from 2001 to 2004 and collected in eight volumes.

In 1986, Kōtarō Makaritōru! won the 10th Kodansha Manga Award in the shōnen category.

Characters

Kōtarō Shindō
A high-school-aged karate prodigy who is descended from a long line of ninja. Although a fighting genius, he lacks common sense and inhibitions, but has a strong sense of justice. He is frequently in trouble with school officials, and often attempts to steal girls' underwear, especially his friend Mayumi's. He is very protective of his long hair, his collection of stolen underwear, and Mayumi.
Mayumi Watase
Captain of the 7th Discipline Squad, Mayumi is Kōtarō's childhood friend and main romantic interest. She is the only person who is able to keep Kōtarō under control. Although not as skilled as Kōtarō, she is proficient in the basics of karate and judo. She is also a member of the school's Decency League, in spite of Kōtarō's disapproval.
Teruhiko Tenkōji
A bald samurai who patrols the school as the enforcer of the Decency League. He initially appears to be an enemy of Kōtarō, but as the series progresses he gradually becomes his main rival and best friend. He comes from a traditional upper-class family and has an iinazuke (fiancée chosen by his parents) named Sayoko. He is highly sensitive about mockery of his baldness, and maintains that his head is actually shaved. He is the only character in the series whose fighting ability is equivalent to Kōtarō's, though they have never fought on genuinely even terms, and it is implied that both of them are reluctant to do so, in case it jeopardises their friendship.

Publication
Written and illustrated by Tatsuya Hiruta, Kōtarō Makaritōru! was serialized in Kodansha's shōnen manga magazine Weekly Shōnen Magazine from August 25, 1982, to August 10, 1994. Kodansha collected its chapters in 59 tankōbon volumes, released from January 20, 1983, to December 14, 1994.

A sequel, titled , was serialized in the same magazine from September 7, 1994, to January 31, 2001. Kodansha collected its chapters in 27 tankōbon volumes, released from March 16, 1995, to March 16, 2001.

A third series, was serialized in the same magazine from May 16, 2001, to August 7, 2002. It was then transferred to Magazine Special, where it was published from December 18, 2002, to July 20, 2004;  the series remains incomplete due to the author's poor health. Kodansha collected its chapters in eight tankōbon volumes, released from October 17, 2001, to October 15, 2004.

Other media
Kōtarō was featured as a playable character in Weekly Shōnen Sunday and Weekly Shōnen Magazine 2009 crossover game Sunday vs Magazine: Shūketsu! Chōjō Daikessen released for the PlayStation Portable (PSP).

Reception
In 1986, Kōtarō Makaritōru! won the 10th Kodansha Manga Award for the shōnen category.

Notes

References

External links
 

1982 manga
1995 manga
2001 manga
Kodansha manga
Martial arts anime and manga
Ninja in anime and manga
Shōnen manga
Winner of Kodansha Manga Award (Shōnen)